Nothorhaphium is a genus of flies belonging to the family Dolichopodidae. It includes four species from Australia and a single species from New Guinea.

Species
Nothorhaphium aemulans (Becker, 1922)
Nothorhaphium callosum Bickel, 1999
Nothorhaphium curalo Bickel, 1999
Nothorhaphium nudicorne Bickel, 1999
Nothorhaphium oro Bickel, 1999

References

Sympycninae
Dolichopodidae genera
Diptera of Australasia